Events in the year 1907 in Brazil.

Incumbents

Federal government
President: Afonso Pena
Vice President: Nilo Peçanha

Governors 
 Alagoas: Euclid Vieira Malta
 Amazonas: Antônio Constantino Néri
 Bahia: José Marcelino de Sousa
 Ceará: Antônio Nogueira Accioli
 Goiás: Miguel da Rocha Lima
 Maranhão: Benedito Pereira Leite
 Mato Grosso: Pedro Leite Osório, then Generoso Pais Leme de Sousa Ponce
 Minas Gerais: João Pinheiro da Silva 
 Pará: Augusto Montenegro
 Paraíba: Valfredo Leal
 Paraná: João Cândido Ferreira, Joaquim Monteiro de Carvalho e Silva
 Pernambuco: Sigismundo Antônio Gonçalves
 Piauí: Álvaro de Assis Osório Mendes (until 5 December); Areolino Antônio de Abreu (from 5 December)
 Rio Grande do Norte: Manuel Moreira Dias (until 23 February); Antonio José de Melo e Sousa (from 23 February)
 Rio Grande do Sul: Antônio Augusto Borges de Medeiros
 Santa Catarina:
 São Paulo: 
 Sergipe:

Vice governors 
 Rio Grande do Norte:
 São Paulo:

Events
7 January - Three new battleships on which construction work is in progress are scrapped as a result of changes to the Brazilian government's requirements.
20 February - The Brazilian government approves the design for its new battleships.
20 April - Brazil annexed land in the East from Colombia through the Vásquez Cobo–Martins treaty.
30 April - The keel of Brazil's latest dreadnought battleship "São Paulo" is laid down at the Vickers shipyard, Barrow-in-Furness, UK.
date unknown 
Construction of the Madeira-Mamoré Railroad begins, linking the cities of Porto Velho and Guajará-Mirim.
The first Brazilian diplomats are officially accredited by the government of Costa Rica.

Arts and culture
Olavo Bilac is elected the "Prince of Brazilian Poets" by the magazine Fon-Fon.

Births
29 January - Clóvis Graciano, artist (died 1988)
9 February - Victor Civita, Italian-Brazilian journalist and publisher, in New York, USA (died 1990)
29 March - Braguinha, composer (died 2006)
4 April - Otávio Fantoni, soccer player (died 1935)
18 April - Manoel de Castro Villas Bôas,  entrepreneur, writer and journalist (d. 1979)
22 May - Luiz Gervazoni, footballer (died 1963)
12 June - José Reis, scientist and journalist (died 2002)
3 August - Ernesto Geisel, military leader and politician (died 1996)
15 December - Oscar Niemeyer, architect (died 2012)

Deaths
1 October - Geraldo Ribeiro de Sousa Resende, Baron Geraldo of Resende, aristocrat, farmer and politician (born 1847)

See also 
1907 in Brazilian football

References

 
1900s in Brazil
Years of the 20th century in Brazil
Brazil
Brazil